Scared Stiff may refer to:

Scared Stiff (1945 film), a comedy directed by Frank McDonald
Scared Stiff (1953 film), a haunted house comedy starring Dean Martin and Jerry Lewis
Scared Stiff (1987 film), a Hong Kong film starring Chow Yun-fat
Scared Stiff (1987 film directed by Richard Friedman), an American horror movie directed by Richard Friedman
Scared Stiff (pinball), a game featuring horrorshow-hostess Elvira
Scared Stiff: Tales of Sex and Death, a collection of horror stories by Ramsey Campbell
Scared Stiff (1991), a children's book by Willo Davis Roberts
Scared Stiff (2008), a horror anthology series created by Douglas A. Plomitallo

See also
Scared Straight (disambiguation)